Angela Ismailos is the director of the documentary Great Directors (2010). and the Film Interlude City of a Dead Women (2016)

About 
Angela Ismailos is a Greek-born director, actor, and writer. She directed and produced Great Directors, a film that features interviews and archival footage of ten great living film directors of independent cinema. Ismailos gives in-depth interviews with Bernardo Bertolucci, Catherine Breillat, Liliana Cavani, Stephen Frears, Todd Haynes, Richard Linklater, Ken Loach, David Lynch, John Sayles, and Agnès Varda. Ismailos studied law and has a master's degree in political science. She is classically trained as an actor and opera singer and began directing plays at a very early age. Ismailos lives and works in New York City

Interlude City Of A Dead Woman 
The second film of Angela Ismailos is called Interlude: City of a Dead Women and includes a cast led by Erich Wildpret and Bernard Hill

References 

Living people
Greek documentary film directors
Greek actresses
Year of birth missing (living people)
Writers from New York City
Greek writers
Women documentary filmmakers